Merwin or Merwyn is a surname and masculine given name.

Surname
Abigail Merwin (1759–1786), who warned her hometown of the arrival of British forces in the American Revolutionary War
Bannister Merwin (1873–1922), early American film director
Jesse Merwin (1783–1852), American schoolmaster, possible inspiration for the character Ichabod Crane in the short story "The Legend of Sleepy Hollow"
John David Merwin (born 1921), former Governor of the United States Virgin Islands
Orange Merwin (1777–1853), member of the U.S. House of Representatives from Connecticut
Sam Merwin, Jr. (1910–1996), mystery and science fiction writer, and editor
Samuel Merwin (writer) (1874–1936), American playwright and author
Samuel Edwin Merwin (1831–1907), American politician, Lieutenant Governor of Connecticut
W. S. Merwin (1927–2019), American poet

Given name
Merwin Coad (born 1924), former member of the U.S. House of Representatives from Iowa
Merwin Graham (1903-1989), American Olympic athlete
Merwin K. Hart (1881–1962), American politician
Merwin Hodel (1931–1988), American football player
Merwin Jacobson (1894–1978), Major League Baseball backup outfielder
Merwin Maier (1908-1942), American attorney
Merwin Mitterwallner (1897-1974), American football player
Merwin Mondesir (born 1976), Canadian actor
Merwin Sibulkin (1926-2006), American scientist
Merwin H. Silverthorn (1896–1985), lieutenant general and Assistant Commandant of the United States Marine Corps
Merwin Crawford Young (1931-2020), American political scientist

See also
Merwin (disambiguation)

Surnames of Welsh origin